The Cape Finisterre Lighthouse is an active lighthouse on  Cape Finisterre, in the Province of A Coruña, on the northwestern coast of Galicia in Spain.

See also

 List of lighthouses in Spain

References

External links
 
 Comisión de faros 
 Autoridad Portuaria de A Coruña

Lighthouses in Galicia (Spain)